Arnetta mercara, the Coorg forest hopper or Coorg forest bob, is a species of butterfly belonging to the family Hesperiidae. It is found in Kerala and Karnataka.

Description

References

m
Butterflies of Asia
Butterflies described in 1932